Ouled Aouf is a town in north-eastern Algeria.

Localities  of the commune 

The commune of Aïn Touta  is composed of 25 localities:

References 

Communes of Batna Province
Cities in Algeria
Algeria